Gloucestershire Archives holds the archives for the county of Gloucestershire and South Gloucestershire. The archives are held at Alvin Street in Gloucester and run by Gloucestershire County Council.

More recently, the Archives at Alvin Street have been rebranded as the Gloucestershire Heritage Hub. The project aims to encourage Gloucestershire residents to investigate their local history; in particular providing an accessible repository of documents for tracking family history. The Hub also provides volunteering opportunities such as the transcribing of historical sources.

In the summer of 2019, the Hub embarked on a construction project to build a new entrance and strongrooms.

References

Gloucester
South Gloucestershire District
Archives in Gloucestershire
History of Gloucestershire
County record offices in England